Stade Bou Kornine, is a multi-purpose stadium in Hammam-Lif, Tunisia. It is currently used by football team Club Sportif de Hammam-Lif. The stadium holds 15,000 people.

It takes its name from the Mount Bou Kornine, overlooking the Gulf of Tunis and Hammam-Lif city.

Bou Kornine Hammam-Lif
Multi-purpose stadiums in Tunisia
CS Hammam-Lif